Chaudhry Farrukh Altaf is a Politician who has been a member of the National Assembly of Pakistan since August 2018.

Political career
Chaudhry Farrukh Altaf contested on Pakistan Peoples Party's ticket in 1997 from NA-45 Jhelum-I (which was renamed later to NA-66 (Jhelum-I)). He obtained 32097 votes and lost to Pakistan Muslim League (N)'s candidate Raja Muhammad Afzal Khan. 
 
During Pervez Musharraf era in 2001, Chaudhry Farrukh Altaf was elected unopposed as district Nazim from district Jhelum. 

In 2008 he joined Pakistan Muslim League (Q), he supported Chaudhry Shahbaz Hussain from NA-66 (Jhelum-I) in 2008 Pakistani general election. In 2013 Pakistani general election he contested from NA-66 (Jhelum-I) on Pakistan Muslim League (Q)'s ticket but lost the seat to Chaudhry Khadim Hussain who obtained 102022 votes. Farrukh obtained 36878 votes and stood third in the poll. 

In 2016, Fawad Chaudhry cousin of Chaudhry Farrukh Altaf  joined PTI, he pursued party leadership to give ticket of NA-66 (Jhelum-I) to his cousin Chaudhry Farrukh Altaf.

He was elected to the National Assembly of Pakistan as a candidate of Pakistan Tehreek-e-Insaf (PTI) from Constituency NA-66 (Jhelum-I) in 2018 Pakistani general election.  He received 112,356 votes and defeated Chaudhry Nadeem Khadim, a candidate of Pakistan Muslim League (N). 

In April 2022, Farrukh Altaf crossed the floor and defected from Pakistan Tehreek-e-Insaf to join the opposition alliance Pakistan Democratic Movement ending in successful No-confidence motion against Imran Khan.

References

Living people
Pakistani MNAs 2018–2023
Chaudhry family (Jhelum)
People from Jhelum District
Year of birth missing (living people)

Politicians from Jhelum